Laura Hardy may refer to:

Laura Hardy (novelist), pseudonym of the British romantic novelist Sheila Holland (1937–2000)
Laura Hardy (The Hardy Boys), a character in the Hardy Boys series
Laura Hardy (Morning Show DJ), host of The Morning Soundcheck with Regular Laura on 107.7 The Eagle in Louisville, KY